I Know You Know I Know is the second solo studio album by Gabby Lang, better known as Gabby La La.

Track listing 
 Alarm Clock
 4 Square
 The Clique
 I Know You Know I Know
 Halloween
 There Is Space
 Rainbows
 The Squirrel
 Nap Time
 Whip In

References 

2011 albums
Gabby La La albums